Dionigi Galletto (26 January 1932  – 25 September 2011) was an Italian mathematician and academician.

He is known for his work on rigid body mechanics, on the mathematical theory of elasticity (including both linear elasticity and finite strain theory), on the history of mathematics and on cosmology and extragalactic celestial mechanics: in particular he is considered one of the founders of the latter branch of cosmology.

He was professor of mathematical physics at the University of Turin: as such, he is considered to be the founder–reorganiser of the Mathematical physics school of Turin in the Post–Second World War period. Among his students was Mauro Francaviglia.

Biography

He started his university studies in Rome as a student of Severi: however his studies were interrupted due to the military service, which led him to Padua. There he graduated with honours in 1960 under Giuseppe Grioli’s guidance, with a thesis on the continuum theory with asymmetric stress: from 1961 to 1968 he worked in Padua as an associate professor, holding also courses on differential geometry as a lecturer.

In 1968, having won a competitive examination for a chair in rational mechanics, he was appointed extraordinary professor of rational mechanics at the University of Palermo: there, Galletto held also courses of mathematical methods for physicists as a lecturer. In 1970 he moved to the University of Turin, working at the Faculty of Mathematics, Physics and Natural Sciences again as extraordinary professor of higher mechanics: in 1971 he became full professor of mathematical physics, a position he held up to 2007, when he retired. Besides the course of mathematical physics, Galletto held various courses relating to the area of his scientific interest: for example he held courses on astronomy as a lecturer. In 2008 he was appointed Emeritus professor.

Honors
In 1965 he was awarded the Ottorino Pomini prize by the Unione Matematica Italiana, jointly with Giuseppe Geymonat and Mario Miranda: the judging commission was composed by Dario Graffi (as the president), Giuseppe Grioli, Ennio De Giorgi and Enzo Martinelli (as the secretary).

He was corresponding member of the Accademia delle Scienze di Torino since 1974, and became national resident member in 1980.

In 1979 he was elected corresponding member of the Accademia Nazionale di Scienze, Lettere e Arti di Modena: later on, he became effective member in 1984 and emeritus member in 2002. He was also corresponding member of the Istituto Lombardo Accademia di Scienze e Lettere.

Since 1980 he was corresponding member of the Accademia dei Lincei, and was elected national member in 1990. In 1989, the same academy awarded him the "Prize of the Minister of Heritage and Cultural Activity" for his work in mathematics and mechanics.

On November 2, 2006 he was elected member of the Serbian Academy of Sciences and Arts, and few months later, on 7 March 2007, he was elected corresponding non resident member to the class of mathematical sciences of the Società Nazionale di Scienze Lettere e Arti in Napoli.

Work

Research activity
During his career, he published more than 150 papers in Italian and international journals. The beginning of his scientific production was under Grioli’s scientific influence: Galletto worked on the topic of his laurea thesis, i.e. on the theory of continua having asymmetric stress characteristics. However, soon he followed his independent research path, with pioneering works that forerun the so called generalised continuum theory. In this theory, among other things, the stress tensor considered is no longer the Cauchy tensor or any similar, double symmetric tensor, but an asymmetric tensor that  generalizes it: and this gives to the theory many further important structural peculiarities.

Selected publications

Research works
. 
. 
. A continuation of the work , with the same title.
.
.
.
.
.
. 
.
.
.
. 
. 
.
.
. "Universe models and light propagation" (English translation of the title).

Biographical, commemorative and historical works
. "Einstein's thought in the work of Guido Fubini and Francesco Severi" (English translation of the title).
, available from the Accademia delle Scienze di Torino. A commemoration of Gaetano Fichera.
.
.

Notes

References

Biographical and general references

. The "Yearbook" of the renowned Italian scientific institution, including an historical sketch of its history, the list of all past and present members as well as a wealth of informations about its academic and scientific activities.
. The first part of an extensive work on the "Accademia di Scienze, Lettere e Arti di Modena", reporting the history of the academy and biographies of members up to the year 2006.
. "A man of great humanity" (English translation of the title) is a commemoration of Dionigi Galletto appeared on a local Savigliano newspaper.
. This commemoration was read at the Turin Academy by the author on June 20, 2012: a video of the conference has been released by 
. This is a monographic fascicle published on the "Bollettino della Unione Matematica Italiana", describing the history of the "Istituto Nazionale di Alta Matematica Francesco Severi" from its foundation in 1939 to 2003: it was written by Gino Roghi and includes a presentation by Salvatore Coen and a preface by Corrado De Concini. It is almost exclusively based on sources from the institute archives: the wealth and variety of materials included, jointly with its appendices and indexes, make this monograph a useful reference not only for the history of the institute itself, but also for the history of many mathematicians who taught or followed the institute courses or simply worked there.
. The "Yearbook 2014" of the Serbian Academy of Sciences and Arts, published by the society itself and describing its past and present hierarchies, and its activities. It also reports some notes on its history, the full list of its members, obituaries and other useful information.
. The "Yearbook 2014" of the Società Nazionale di Scienze Lettere e Arti in Napoli, published by the society itself and describing its past and present hierarchies, and its activities. It also reports some notes on its history, the full list of its members and other useful information.
.
.

Scientific references
.

External links

1932 births
2011 deaths
20th-century Italian mathematicians
21st-century Italian mathematicians
Mathematical physicists
Sapienza University of Rome alumni
Members of the Lincean Academy
Members of the Serbian Academy of Sciences and Arts
University of Padua alumni
Academic staff of the University of Palermo
Academic staff of the University of Turin